Rod Smith (born February 22, 1973) is an American football coach and former player who is currently the offensive coordinator at Jacksonville State University.  Prior to that, he was an offensive analyst at the University of Virginia. Smith has also served as the interim head coach, offensive coordinator and quarterbacks coach at the University of Illinois at Urbana–Champaign.

Playing career
Smith played college football as a quarterback at Glenville State College from 1993 to 1996, where he played for head coach Rich Rodriguez.

Coaching career 
After graduating from Glenville State in 1997, Smith was hired to be the offensive coordinator on his father's coaching staff at Franklin High School in West Virginia. He spent time as the offensive coordinator at both Urbana University in Ohio and West Virginia Tech before reuniting with Rodriguez at both Clemson and West Virginia as a graduate assistant. He was hired by Jim Leavitt to be the passing game coordinator and quarterbacks coach at South Florida and was promoted to offensive coordinator for the 2005 season. Smith resigned from South Florida after the 2006 season to reunite with Rich Rodriguez at West Virginia as the team's quarterbacks coach.

Michigan
Smith was named the quarterbacks coach at Michigan in 2008 after Rich Rodriguez was named the head coach.

Indiana
After Rodriguez was fired from Michigan in 2010, Smith spent the 2011 season on Kevin Wilson's staff at Indiana as a co-offensive coordinator and the quarterbacks coach.

Arizona
After Rodriguez was hired to be the head coach Arizona in 2012, Smith joined Rodriguez's staff as the co-offensive coordinator and quarterbacks coach. Smith was a nominee for the Broyles Award given annually to the nation's top assistant coach, after the 2017 season at Arizona.

Illinois
After Rodriguez was fired from Arizona in 2018, Smith departed the Arizona coaching staff to join Lovie Smith's coaching staff at Illinois. He was named the interim head coach after Smith was terminated on December 13, 2020.

Virginia
Smith was hired by Virginia as an offensive analyst prior to the 2021 season, where he works with Offensive Coordinator Robert Anae.  As of October 29, 2021, the Cavaliers lead the nation in passing offense. He left after the 2021 season.

Penn State
Smith was hired as an offensive analyst at Penn State in 2022.

Jacksonville State
Smith was named the offensive coordinator and quarterbacks coach at Jacksonville State on June 12, 2022.

Personal life
Smith and his wife Charlene have two children, Alex and Sasha. Alex is currently a defensive back at West Liberty University's football team.

Head coaching record

‡ Served as interim HC

References

External links
 
 Illinois profile

1973 births
Living people
American football quarterbacks
Arizona Wildcats football coaches
Clemson Tigers football coaches
Glenville State Pioneers football players
Illinois Fighting Illini football coaches
Indiana Hoosiers football coaches
Jacksonville State Gamecocks football coaches
Michigan Wolverines football coaches
South Florida Bulls football coaches
Urbana Blue Knights football coaches
Virginia Cavaliers football coaches
West Virginia Mountaineers football coaches
West Virginia Tech Golden Bears football coaches
High school football coaches in West Virginia
People from Franklin, West Virginia
Coaches of American football from West Virginia
Players of American football from West Virginia